Chili oil is a condiment made from vegetable oil that has been infused with chili peppers. Different types of oil and hot peppers are used, and other components may also be included. It is commonly used in Chinese cuisine, Southeast Asian cuisine, and elsewhere. It is particularly popular in western Chinese cuisines such as Sichuan cuisine, Hunan cuisine, Guizhou cuisine, and Shaanxi cuisine where it is used as an ingredient in cooked dishes as well as a condiment. It is sometimes used as a dip for meat and dim sum. It is also employed in the Korean Chinese noodle soup dish jjamppong.

Chili oil is typically red in color. It is made from vegetable oil, often soybean oil or sesame oil, although olive oil or other oils may be used. Other spices may be included such as Sichuan pepper, garlic, or paprika. Commercial preparations may include other kinds of oil, water, dried garlic, soy sauce, and sugar. Recipes targeted to Western cooks also suggest other popular oils such as rapeseed, grapeseed or peanut, and any dried or fresh chili peppers. The solids typically settle to the bottom of the container in which it is stored. When using chili oil, the cook or diner may choose how much of the solids to use; sometimes only the oil is used, without any solids.

Chili oil is easy to prepare, and is also commercially available in glass jars or bottles.

Varieties and regional use

China 
Chili oil has various names in China and comes in many different types depending on the region. It is called yóu pō là zǐ (油泼辣子, chili pepper splashed with oil) in Shaanxi province and là yóu (辣油, spicy oil) or hóng yóu (紅油, red oil) in Sichuan. Among those names the most popular one is là jiāo yóu (辣椒油, chili pepper oil).

In China, chili oil is prepared basically by pouring hot vegetable oil slowly on chili pepper powder or chopped chili pepper. Many other ingredients can be added alongside to enrich flavor such as Chinese black vinegar, minced garlic, dried ginger skin, sesame seeds, sesame oil, Sichuan peppercorn, cinnamon, star anise and bay leaf. The popular chili oil brand Lao Gan Ma is based on chili oils from Guizhou. There are also many condiments derived from chili oil, such as chili oil and douchi (豆豉, fermented black soybeans).

Japan

It is typically a clear, chili-infused sesame oil, and the chopped chili pepper used is typically red, imparting a reddish tint to the oil. Other ingredients used may include soy oil, corn oil, dried aloe, ginger, guava leaves, leek leaves, paprika, and turmeric.

It is less spicy-hot, and includes chunks of food such as fried garlic and fried onion in the oil.

Italy
The Italian variety of chili oil (olio di peperoncino) originates from the southern region of Calabria.  It is often added to dishes, sauces, salads, or served with cheeses and antipasto.  This variety of chili oil uses olive oil as a base, and has a unique brine flavor.  The peperoncino is a popular food item in Calabria.

Portugal
Portuguese chili oil is made by cold (refrigerated) infusion of dried red chili peppers in olive oil in a tightly capped bottle for one month.

Turkey 

Chili and pepper infused oils are used widely as a condiment in Turkish cuisine. Turkish dumpling mantı is served with chili infused oil poured over the garlic yogurt sauce. The oil is prepared with mixing chili paste and certain spices and herbs such as black pepper, chili flakes or powder, dried mint and cumin.

Strained yogurt is also topped with sizzling oil infused with dried hot chili peppers. This dish is called atom in Turkish and typically served as a meze.

See also

 Chili sauce
 List of condiments
 List of dips
 XO sauce
 Peperoncino

References

Chinese condiments
Dips (food)
Japanese condiments
Vegetable oils
Chili sauce and paste